Diocesan is derived from the words Diocese and Dio.

Diocesan may also refer to:
St. John's Diocesan Girls' Higher Secondary School, India
Diocesan Boys' School, Hong Kong
Diocesan Girls' School, Hong Kong
Diocesan School for Girls (Auckland), New Zealand